Ibiza Rocks Hotel is a hotel operated by Ibiza Rocks in the centre of the town of Sant Antoni de Portmany, on the Spanish island of Ibiza. The hotel is built around a central courtyard with a pool, bar and stage for events in the center. Formerly called Club Paraiso Mediterraneo, the hotel is on the Carrer de Cervantes, in the central area of Sant Antonio.

Location
The Hotel is within centre of  Sant Antoni de Portmany.

History
Club Paraiso Mediterraneo was first opened in 1998  as an apartment hotel with 368 units and had a Spanish 3 star rating. In 2008 the Hotel was bought by the Ibiza Rocks organization with a different ethos to the original apartment hotel complex. Renamed the Ibiza Rocks Hotel, the hotel began hosting live music events with bands and DJs on its poolside main stage.

Concept
The hotel hosts regular events in a central courtyard. The hotel room rate includes entrance to the event.

References

External links 
 
 http://www.ibizarocks.com/hotel/

Hotels in Ibiza
Hotels established in 1998
1998 establishments in Spain
Apartment hotels